Huon Peninsula is a large rugged peninsula on the island of New Guinea in Morobe Province, eastern Papua New Guinea. It is named after French explorer Jean-Michel Huon de Kermadec. The peninsula is dominated by the steep Saruwaged and Finisterre and Cromwell Mountains. The nearest large town is the Morobe provincial capital Lae to the south, while settlements on the north coast include the former German town of Finschhafen, the district capital of Wasu, Malalamai and Saidor with its World War II era Saidor Airport.

The area was the site of the Huon Peninsula campaign of World War II, in 1943-44 as Japanese troops retreating from Lae fought their way over the Finisterre Mountains to Madang on the north coast.

Flora and fauna

The rainforests that cover these remote mountains provide habitats for many birds and animals and have been designated the Huon Peninsula montane rain forests ecoregion. The rainforest of the hillsides consists of shorter trees and more herbs than you would find in lowland rainforests around the world, with predominant species of tree including Pometia, Canarium, Anisoptera, Cryptocarya laurels, and Terminalia, while the higher slopes have thicker forests of yet smaller trees and the higher slopes of the Cromwell Range in particular hold the best-preserved large forest of Dacrydium conifers in the southern hemisphere.

Mammals indigenous to the Huon region include the endangered Matschie's tree-kangaroo, while the birds include many of typical Australasian families such as bowerbirds, Australian robins, honeyeaters  (including the endemic spangled honeyeater) and birds of paradise (including the endemic Huon astrapia). There are also endemic butterflies. Although some logging has taken place, the forests of the Huon Peninsula mountains are mostly undisturbed.

Conservation 
The raised beach coastal terraces of Huon were added to the UNESCO World Heritage Tentative List on June 6, 2006 in the Mixed (Cultural + Natural) category.

In 2009 the YUS Conservation Area was established in the northern part of the peninsula. YUS stretches over 760 km² and includes the three rivers, Yopno, Uruwa and Som, for which it was named.

See also
Huon languages

References

Further reading 
 

Morobe Province
Peninsulas of Papua New Guinea
Tropical and subtropical moist broadleaf forests
Montane forests
Huon Peninsula montane rain forests